The 1963 Cincinnati Bearcats football team represented the University of Cincinnati in the Missouri Valley Conference (MVC) during the 1963 NCAA University Division football season. In their third season under head coach Chuck Studley, the Bearcats compiled an 6–4 record (2–1 against conference opponents) and shared the MVC championship with Wichita.

Schedule

References

Cincinnati
Cincinnati Bearcats football seasons
Cincinnati Bearcats football